Scopula destituta is a moth of the  family Geometridae. It is found on the Sula Islands.

References

Moths described in 1866
destituta
Moths of Indonesia